Donald Bengtsson Hamilton (March 24, 1916 – November 20, 2006) was an American writer of novels, short stories, and non-fiction about the outdoors. His novels consist mostly of paperback originals, principally spy fiction, but also crime fiction and westerns, such as The Big Country. He is best known for his long-running Matt Helm series (1960-1993), which chronicles the adventures of an undercover counter-agent/assassin working for a secret American government agency.  The noted critic Anthony Boucher wrote: "Donald Hamilton has brought to the spy novel the authentic hard realism of Dashiell Hammett; and his stories are as compelling, and probably as close to the sordid truth of espionage, as any now being told."

Life
Hamilton was born on March 24, 1916, in Uppsala, Sweden, to Dr. Bengt Leopold Knutsson Hamilton and Elise Franzisca Hamilton (née Neovius). On September 27, 1924, he boarded the S/S Stockholm with his mother and three sisters at the Port of Gothenburg, Sweden; the ship arrived at the Port of New York on October 6, 1924. The family's destination was Boston, Massachusetts, where they joined his father, Doctor Hamilton. Donald attended the University of Chicago (receiving a Bachelor of Science degree in 1938), and served in the United States Navy Reserve during World War II. He was married to Kathleen Hamilton (née Stick) from 1941 until her death in 1989. The couple had four children: Hugo, Elise, Gordon, and Victoria Hamilton.

A long-time resident of Santa Fe, New Mexico, Hamilton was a skilled outdoorsman and hunter who wrote non-fiction articles for outdoor magazines and published a book-length collection of them.  For a number of years after leaving Santa Fe he lived on his own yacht, then moved to Sweden, where he lived until his death in 2006.  A number of his Matt Helm novels are situated in the Santa Fe area and American Southwest in general; as Hamilton developed an interest in boating, many of the books began to have a nautical component as well.

Hamilton began his writing career in 1946, submitting pieces to fiction magazines like Collier's Weekly and The Saturday Evening Post. His first novel, Date With Darkness, was published in 1947; over the next 46 years he published a total of 38 novels. His first three books were published in hardcover by Rinehart. After World War II, American publishers began to experiment with issuing original paperback fiction. Most of his early novels — published between 1954 and 1960 — were typical paperback originals of the era: fast-moving tales in paperbacks with lurid covers, whether suspense, spy, or western.  The most interesting of them is, arguably, Assignment: Murder, (alternate title: Assassins Have Starry Eyes), in which a mathematician working on the design for a nuclear bomb has to save his kidnapped wife from a group of shadowy villains. Two classic western movies, The Big Country and The Violent Men, were adapted from his western novels (The Big Country and Smoky Valley respectively.)

More substantial was the Matt Helm series, published by Gold Medal, which began with Death of a Citizen in 1960 and ran for 27 books, ending in 1993 with The Damagers.  Helm, a wartime agent in a secret agency that specialized in assassinating Nazis, is drawn back, after 15 years as a civilian, into a post-war world of espionage and assassination.  He narrates his adventures in a brisk, matter-of-fact tone with an occasional undertone of deadpan humor. He describes gunfights, knife fights, torture, and (off-stage) sexual conquests with a carefully maintained professional detachment, like a pathologist dictating an autopsy report or a police officer describing an investigation. Over the course of the series, this detachment comes to define Helm's character. He is a professional doing a job; the job is killing people.  Hamilton completed one more Matt Helm novel, The Dominators in 2002, that has not been published.

The noted Golden Age mystery writer John Dickson Carr began reviewing books for Ellery Queen's Mystery Magazine in 1969, and often praised thrillers of the day. According to Carr's biographer, "Carr found Donald Hamilton's Matt Helm to be 'my favorite secret agent,'" although Hamilton's books had little in common with Carr's.  "The explanation may lie in Carr's comment that in espionage novels he preferred Matt Helm's Cloud cuckoo land.  Carr never valued realism in fiction."

Hamilton died in his sleep on November 20, 2006.  His papers are housed at the Charles E. Young Research Library at the University of California, Los Angeles.

Works

Matt Helm-series
 1960 Death of a Citizen
 1960 The Wrecking Crew
 1961 The Removers
 1962 The Silencers
 1962 Murderer's Row
 1963 The Ambushers
 1964 The Shadowers
 1964 The Ravagers
 1965 The Devastators
 1966 The Betrayers
 1968 The Menacers
 1969 The Interlopers
 1971 The Poisoners
 1973 The Intriguers
 1974 The Intimidators
 1975 The Terminators
 1976 The Retaliators
 1977 The Terrorizers
 1982 The Revengers
 1983 The Annihilators 
 1984 The Infiltrators 
 1985 The Detonators 
 1986 The Vanishers
 1987 The Demolishers
 1989 The Frighteners 
 1992 The Threateners 
 1993 The Damagers 
 2002 The Dominators (unpublished)

Non Series Crime Novels
 1947 Date With Darkness
 1948 The Steel Mirror
 1954 Night Walker
 1955 Line of Fire
 1956 Assignment: Murder / Assassins Have Starry Eyes
 1980 The Mona Intercept

Short Stories
 1947 Murder Twice Told (features 2 stories, Deadfall and The Black Cross)

Westerns
 1954 Smoky Valley
 1956 Mad River
 1958 The Big Country
 1960 The Man From Santa Clara / The Two-Shoot Gun 
 1960 Texas Fever
 1955 The Violent Men (movie adaption)

Non Fiction
 1970 On Guns and Hunting
 1980 Cruises with Kathleen

Editor
 1967 Iron Men and Silver Stars

Film adaptations
The Violent Men, 1955; adaptation of Smoky Valley

Five Steps to Danger, 1957; adaptation of The Steel Mirror

The Big Country, 1958; adaptation of The Big Country (Hamilton novel)

General audiences may be more familiar with Matt Helm through a series of popular action-comedy films produced in the late 1960s starring Dean Martin in the title role. These light-hearted films are only very loosely based upon Hamilton's writings, which are much more realistic, gritty and noir. 

 The Silencers, 1966
 Murderers' Row (novel), 1966
 The Ambushers, 1967
 The Wrecking Crew, 1969

DreamWorks optioned the film rights to Hamilton's books in 2002 and began planning a more serious adaptation of the Matt Helm novels, but the project is in limbo.

Notes

Sources
 John Dickson Carr, The Man Who Explained Miracles, by Douglas G. Greene, New York, 1995
Encyclopedia of Mystery and Detection, by Chris Steinbrunner and Otto Penzler, New York, 1976,

External links
 
 Matt Helm: The Unofficial Home Page
 Thriller writer Donald Hamilton
 Writer at Work: Donald Hamilton,  A long article in two parts. 

1916 births
2006 deaths
American non-fiction outdoors writers
American spy fiction writers
American thriller writers
Western (genre) writers
Writers from Santa Fe, New Mexico
20th-century American novelists
American male novelists
People from Uppsala
Swedish emigrants to the United States
University of Chicago alumni
United States Navy personnel of World War II
20th-century American male writers
20th-century American non-fiction writers
American male non-fiction writers
United States Navy reservists